The Turduli (Greek Tourduloi) or Turtuli were an ancient pre-Roman people of the southwestern Iberian Peninsula.

Location
The Turduli tribes lived mainly in the south and centre of modern Portugal – in the east of the provinces of Beira Litoral, coastal Estremadura and Alentejo along the Guadiana valley, and in Extremadura and Andalusia in Spain. Their capital was the old oppidum of Ibolca (sometimes transliterated as Ipolka), known as Obulco in Roman times, and which currently corresponds to the city of Porcuna, currently located between the provinces of Córdoba and Jaén. Apart from Ibolca, the pre-Roman towns most strongly associated with the Turdulli include Budua (Badajoz), Dipo (Guadajira), Mirobriga (Capilla), and Sisapo (Almadén).

Origins
While they are sometimes described, in the available ancient sources, as being related ethnically to the neighboring Turdetani of Baetica (modern Andalusia), the exact ethnic origins remain obscure. The only evidence regarding the original Turdulian language are a few funerary inscriptions. Linguistic studies of these texts suggest that the early Turduli spoke an Indo-European language. Some scholars have put forward evidence that the language belonged to the Anatolian branch of Indo-European and was similar, in particular, to Paeonian-Mysian. There may also have been cultural links to the Ligurians and Illyrians (who were native to the western Balkans). However, the Turduli were later generally regarded as Celts, suggesting that they were significantly influenced by neighboring tribes like the Celtici.

History
According to the 4th century BC Greek geographer and explorer Pytheas, quoted by Strabo in the 1st century AD, their ancestral homeland was located north of Turdetania (the region where was located the semi-legendary Kingdom of Tartessos, in the Baetis River valley, the present-day Guadalquivir), in the modern Spanish eastern Extremadura region, where their ancient capital Regina Tourdulorum (Reina – Badajoz) once stood.

The collapse of Tartessos in around 530 BC, and migrations by the Celtici in the 6th-5th centuries BC appear to have also caused mass migrations by the Turduli. The majority settled the middle Anas (Guadiana) basin, a region known as Beturia or Baeturia Turdulorum roughly corresponding to parts of eastern Alentejo, and the western half of the modern Badajoz and southeastern Huelva provinces, hence the name Baetici Turduli. Others went west, colonizing the central coastal Portuguese region of Estremadura and became known as Turduli Oppidani. Some went south, where they settled the present Setubal peninsula along the Tagus river mouth and the lower Sardum (Sado; Kallipos in the Greek sources) river valley as the Bardili. The remnants, designated Turduli Veteres in the ancient sources, migrated northwards in conjunction with the Celtici and ended settling the Beira Litoral, a coastal region situated along the lower Douro and Vacca (Vouga) river basins.

See also
Bardili (Turduli)
Cynetes
Tartessos
Turdetani
Turduli Oppidani
Turduli Veteres
Pre-Roman peoples of the Iberian Peninsula

Notes

References

 Jorge de Alarcão, O Domínio Romano em Portugal, Publicações Europa-América, Lisboa (1988) 
 Jorge de Alarcão et alii, De Ulisses a Viriato – O primeiro milénio a.C., Museu Nacional de Arqueologia, Instituto Português de Museus, Lisboa (1996) 
 Luis Berrocal-Rangel, Los pueblos célticos del soroeste de la Península Ibérica, Editorial Complutense, Madrid (1992) 
 Francisco Burillo Mozota, Los Celtíberos, etnias y estados, Crítica, Barcelona (1998, revised edition 2007) 
 João Ferreira do Amaral & Augusto Ferreira do Amaral, Povos Antigos em Portugal – paleontologia do território hoje Português, Quetzal Editores, Lisboa (1997)  
 Alberto José Lorrio Alvarado, Los Celtíberos, Universidad Complutense de Madrid, Murcia (1997) 
 Ángel Montenegro et alii, Historia de España 2 - colonizaciones y formación de los pueblos prerromanos (1200-218 a.C), Editorial Gredos, Madrid (1989)

External links
Detailed map of the Pre-Roman Peoples of Iberia (around 200 BC)

Ancient peoples of Portugal
Tribes of Lusitania
Celtic tribes of the Iberian Peninsula
Ancient peoples of Spain